Giv or GIV may refer to:

Places 
 Giv, Markazi, Iran
 Giv, South Khorasan, Iran

Other uses 
 Giv (Shahnameh) a character in the Persian epic Shahnameh
 CCDC88A, a protein
 The Governor's Institutes of Vermont
 Gulfstream IV
 Rostam Giv (1880–1980), Iranian politician and philanthropist

See also
 G4 (disambiguation)
 Give (disambiguation)